Prabhu Lal Saini is a Rajasthani politician. He is a former cabinet minister in the government of Rajasthan led by Vasundhara Raje. He is a senior leader of Bharatiya Janata Party. He serves in the Rajasthan Legislative Assembly from Tonk district. He is minister of agriculture and animal husbandry.

Early life 
He was born in Anwa near Tonk. He completed his schooling in village Anwa and Dooni.

Career 
He served as Sarpanch from 1982 to 92.

He was elected Pradhan of Deoli Thesil of Tonk District.

He was agriculture Minister of Rajasthan from 2003 to 2008.

In the 2008 election, he was elected to the Hindoli (Bundi) assembly seat.

In 2013, Prabhu Lal Saini of BJP won 'the Anta' Assembly seat. Prabhu Lal Saini secured 48.84% of the total votes polled.

And then he became the Agriculture Minister of Rajasthan from 2013 to 2018.

References

Living people
People from Tonk district
State cabinet ministers of Rajasthan
1954 births
Rajasthan MLAs 2013–2018
Bharatiya Janata Party politicians from Rajasthan